Joseph Muller (Orschwiller, 9 March 1895 — Lamarche, 8 May 1975) was a French professional road bicycle racer. He rode and finished the Tour de France from 1920 to 1924, winning one stage in the 1923 Tour de France and finishing 6th in the 1924 Tour de France.

Major results

1923
Tour de France:
Winner stage 12
1924
Paris-Nancy

External links
Joseph Muller profile at the Cycling Website
Official Tour de France results for Joseph Muller

1895 births
1975 deaths
French male cyclists
French Tour de France stage winners
Sportspeople from Bas-Rhin
Cyclists from Grand Est